The 2018 Conference USA men's soccer tournament (known as the 2018 Air Force Reserve Men's Soccer Championship for sponsorship purposes) was the 24th edition of the tournament. Kentucky received Conference USA's automatic berth into the 2018 NCAA Division I Men's Soccer Championship by winning the final match over Charlotte by a score of 1–0.

Seeding 

The top seven programs based on conference record will qualify for the CUSA Tournament.

Bracket

Results

Quarterfinals

Semifinals

Championship

Statistics

Goals

All Tournament Team

References

External links 
 CUSA Men's Soccer Tournament

Conference USA Men's Soccer Tournament
Conference USA Men's Soccer Tournament
Conference USA Men's Soccer Tournament